Pingtang Miao, named after Pingtang County (平塘 píngtáng) in which it is spoken, is a group of Miao language varieties of China.

Classification
The four varieties of Pingtang were listed as unclassified branches of Chuanqiandian Miao (Western Hmongic) in Wang (1983). Li (2000) classified them together as one of eight branches of Western Hmongic, a position maintained in Wu and Yang (2010).

Varieties
There are four varieties of Pingtang according to Li (2000):
North (Strecker's Pingtang Miao), 11,000 speakers
East (Strecker's Dushan Miao), 4,000
South (Strecker's Luodian–Pingyan Miao), 6,000
West (Strecker's Wangmo–Luodian Miao  Mhang), 3,000

These are at approximately the distance of the varieties of the other branches of West Hmongic, which Ethnologue assigned separate ISO codes.

References

West Hmongic languages
Languages of China